The powerlifting event at the 2015 Parapan American Games was run from 8–11 August 2015 at the Mississauga Sports Centre in Mississauga.

Medal summary

Medal table

Medal events

Men

Women

References

External links
Powerlifting Results
Records Brokens

Events at the 2015 Parapan American Games